The calculus of concepts is an abstract language and theory, which was developed to simplify the reasons behind effective messaging when delivered to a specific target or set of targets. The theory aims to maximize the likelihood of desired outcomes, by using messaging elements and techniques while analyzing the delivery mechanisms in certain scenarios. The reduction of uncertainty, but not its elimination, is often cost effective and practical.

Empowered by the internet of things (IoT) the framework looks at numerous device such as smart phones, tablets, laptops, hand held gaming devices, GPS devices, automobile Event Data Recorders and other electronic devices as remote sensors capable of providing data channels.

By using elements, the theory discovers underlying key concepts and their relations to better understand how messages can by used to elicit desired behaviors through mental model heuristics and biases. The framework does not serve up spam to potential consumers; it is a new paradigm for effective messaging. The nature of the data produced and consumed by devices in the IoT naturally lends itself to location-based awareness.

Just-in-time and real-time broadcasting of key messages gives the framework an extra dimension, putting it at the forefront of behavioral methodologies. Broadcasting can take place across a number of platforms, text, photographic, video, audio or even direct human contact.

The use of anchoring-and-adjustment, framing and representativeness heuristics provides fertile grounds for “re-wiring” the decision making processes to include either positive or mitigating mental models of a given concept or set of related concepts.  The “re-wiring” will often produce results that have a significant impact on later decisions and behaviors on the target audience. The framework analyses key factors that influence the effectiveness of messaging mechanisms and how differing approaches can lead to entirely different results.

Background
The calculus of concepts framework has been practically implemented utilizing a combination of Naive Bayes classification  and Support Vector Machines (SVM) algorithms to actively identify the key components of a messaging campaign and its effectiveness. The effectiveness of a communications campaign is often measured by numerous results including reach, frequency and duration.

The training data set for the model implementation utilized the potential messages and delivery mechanisms with Actors, Actions, Objects, Contexts and Indicia as a few examples.

Each concept within the framework is treated by the practical implementation as either an independent or dependent variable (as applicable) and therefore may have a meaningful effect on the outcome of any communication. As with any machine-learning tool the Calculus of Concepts model implementation inputs can be either nominal or ordinal and depending on the particular case.

Practical example
Between 2005 and 2012 one of the largest oil companies in China attempted to buy the twelfth biggest oil company in Canada. Initial proposals and takeover plans were rejected due to a number of issues surrounding political tensions.

Stakeholders identified Environment, Context, Domain, Event, Condition, State, Decision, Relation, Actor, Action and Object concepts that needed to be in place to have the key decision makers utilizing the mental models needed to secure the takeover.

Over the next 7 years messaging activities were fielded by the Chinese company and its authorized agents, specifically designed to elicit Ideations and Decisions that would result in the takeover going through. In 2012, the takeover was completed after a coordinated and concerted field messaging activity.

References

Further reading
 The process of communication: an introduction to theory and practice David Kenneth Berlo (1960)
 The Image: A Guide to Pseudo-Events in America Boorstin, Daniel J (1992)
 Social Engineering: The Art of Human Hacking Hadnagy, Christopher (2010)
 Sway: The Irresistible Pull of Irrational Behavior Brafman, Ori, Brafman, Rom (2009)

Communication theory
Human communication